The Legend of Holy Simplicity is a 1920 German silent drama film directed by Joe May and starring Eva May, Alfred Gerasch and Wilhelm Diegelmann.

The art director Erich Kettelhut worked on the film's sets.

Cast
 Eva May as Heilige Simplicia
 Alfred Gerasch as Ritter Rochus
 Wilhelm Diegelmann as Herbergswirt
 Elisabeth Wilke as Oberin des Klosters
 Georg John as Blinder Bettler
 Max Gülstorff as Wanderer
 Lia Eibenschütz as Magd auf der Drachenburg
 Martha Rhema
 Rudolf Biebrach

References

Bibliography
 Bock, Hans-Michael & Bergfelder, Tim. The Concise CineGraph. Encyclopedia of German Cinema. Berghahn Books, 2009.
 Nelmes, Jill & Selbo, Jule. Women Screenwriters: An International Guide. Palgrave Macmillan, 2015.

External links

1920 films
Films of the Weimar Republic
German silent feature films
Films directed by Joe May
German black-and-white films
Films set in the Middle Ages
UFA GmbH films
1920s historical drama films
German historical drama films
1920 drama films
Silent drama films
1920s German films
1920s German-language films